Kim Young-Hoon (born October 2, 1978) is a South Korean actor.

Filmography

Film

Television series

Web series

References

External links 
 
 
 
 
 

1978 births
Living people
South Korean male television actors
South Korean male film actors
Seoul Institute of the Arts alumni